Grand Canyon National Park, located in northwestern Arizona, is the 15th site in the United States to have been named as a national park. The park's central feature is the Grand Canyon, a gorge of the Colorado River, which is often considered one of the Wonders of the World. The Grand Canyon was designated a World Heritage Site by UNESCO in 1979. The park celebrated its 100th anniversary on February 26, 2019.

History

The Grand Canyon became well known to Americans in the 1880s after railroads were built and pioneers developed infrastructure and early tourism. In 1903, President Theodore Roosevelt visited the site and said, The Grand Canyon fills me with awe. It is beyond comparison—beyond description; absolutely unparalleled through-out the wide world ... Let this great wonder of nature remain as it now is. Do nothing to mar its grandeur, sublimity and loveliness. You cannot improve on it. But you can keep it for your children, your children's children, and all who come after you, as the one great sight which every American should see.

Despite Roosevelt's enthusiasm and strong interest in preserving land for public use, the Grand Canyon was not immediately designated as a national park. The first bill to establish Grand Canyon National Park was introduced in 1882 by then-Senator Benjamin Harrison, which would have established Grand Canyon as the third national park in the United States, after Yellowstone and Mackinac. Harrison unsuccessfully reintroduced his bill in 1883 and 1886; after his election to the presidency, he established the Grand Canyon Forest Reserve in 1893. Theodore Roosevelt created the Grand Canyon Game Preserve by proclamation on November 28, 1906, and the Grand Canyon National Monument on January 11, 1908. Further Senate bills to establish the site as a national park were introduced and defeated in 1910 and 1911, before the Grand Canyon National Park Act was finally signed by President Woodrow Wilson on February 26, 1919. The National Park Service, established in 1916, assumed administration of the park.

The creation of the park was an early success of the conservation movement. Its national park status may have helped thwart proposals to dam the Colorado River within its boundaries. (Later, the Glen Canyon Dam would be built upriver.) A second Grand Canyon National Monument to the west was proclaimed in 1932. In 1975, that monument and Marble Canyon National Monument, which was established in 1969 and followed the Colorado River northeast from the Grand Canyon to Lees Ferry, were made part of Grand Canyon National Park. In 1979, UNESCO declared the park a World Heritage Site. The 1987 the National Parks Overflights Act found that
"Noise associated with aircraft overflights at the Grand Canyon National Park is causing a significant adverse effect on the natural quiet and experience of the park and current aircraft operations at the Grand Canyon National Park have raised serious concerns regarding public safety, including concerns regarding the safety of park users."

In 2010, Grand Canyon National Park was honored with its own coin under the America the Beautiful Quarters program. On February 26, 2019, the Grand Canyon National Park commemorated 100 years since its designation as a national park.

The Grand Canyon had been part of the National Park Service's Intermountain Region until 2018. Today, the Grand Canyon is a part of Region 8, also known as the Lower Colorado Basin.

Legal history timeline 
1882 First unsuccessful attempt to establish a Grand Canyon National Park
1893 Designated a "forest reserve" by President Benjamin Harrison (Presidential Proclamation #45)
1908 Established as Grand Canyon National Monument by President Theodore Roosevelt (Presidential Proclamation #794)
1919 Designation of Grand Canyon National Park by an act of Congress on February 26 (40 Stat 1175)
1975 Grand Canyon National Park Enlargement Act an act of Congress on January 3 (88 Stat 2089) (Public Law 93-620)
1979 Designation as a World Heritage Site on October 26

Administrators 
William Harrison Peters (acting): August 1919 – September 1920
Dewitt L. Raeburn: October 1920  –  December 1921
John Roberts White (acting): December 1921  –  February 1922
Walter Wilson Crosby: February 1922  –  January 1924
George C. Bolton (acting): January 1923  –  June 1923
John Ross Eakin: January 1924  –  April 1927
Miner Raymond Tillotson: April 1927  –  December 1938
James V. Lloyd (acting): December 1938  –  February 1939
Harold Child Bryant (acting): February 1939 –  January 1940
James V. Lloyd (acting): January 1940 –  August 1940
Frank Alvah Kittredge: August 1940 –  July 1941
Harold Child Bryant: August 1941 –  March 1954 
Preston P. Patraw: May 1954 –  July 1955
John Sherman McLaughlin: August 1955 –  March 1964
Howard B. Stricklin: March 1964 –  February 1969
Robert R. Lovegren April 1969 –  July 1972
Merle E. Stitt: August 1972 –  January 1980 
Bruce W. Shaw (acting): January 1980 –  May 1980 
Richard W. Marks: May 1980 –  December 1988
John C. Reed (acting): December 1988 –  January 1989
John H. Davis: January 1989 –  August 1991
Robert Chandler: October 1991 –  October 1993
Boyd Evison (acting): January 1994 –  July 1994
Robert L. Arnberger: July 1994 –  October 2000

Geography

The Grand Canyon, including its extensive system of tributary canyons, is valued for its combination of size, depth, and exposed layers of colorful rocks dating back to Precambrian times. The canyon itself was created by the incision of the Colorado River and its tributaries after the Colorado Plateau was uplifted, causing the Colorado River system to develop along its present path.

The primary public areas of the park are the South and North Rims, and adjacent areas of the canyon itself. The rest of the park is extremely rugged and remote, although many places are accessible by pack trail and backcountry roads. The South Rim is more accessible than the North Rim and accounts for 90% of park visitation.

The park headquarters are at Grand Canyon Village, not far from the South Entrance to the park, near one of the most popular viewpoints.

South Rim

Most visitors to the park come to the South Rim, arriving on Arizona State Route 64. The highway enters the park through the South Entrance, near Tusayan, Arizona, and heads eastward, leaving the park through the East Entrance. Interstate 40 provides access to the area from the south. From the north, U.S. Route 89 connects Utah, Colorado, and the North Rim to the South Rim. Overall, some 30 miles of the South Rim are accessible by road.

Services
Grand Canyon Village is the primary visitor services area in the park. It is a full-service community, including lodging, fuel, food, souvenirs, a hospital, churches, and access to trails and guided walks and talks.

Lodging
Several lodging facilities are available along the South Rim. Hotels and other lodging include El Tovar, Bright Angel Lodge, Kachina Lodge, Thunderbird Lodge, and Maswik Lodge, all of which are located in Grand Canyon Village, and Phantom Ranch, located on the canyon floor. There is also an RV Park named Trailer Village. All of these facilities are managed by Xanterra Parks & Resorts, while the Yavapai Lodge (also in the village area) is managed by Delaware North.

North Rim

The North Rim area of the park is located on the Kaibab Plateau and Walhalla Plateau, directly across the Grand Canyon from the principal visitor areas on the South Rim. The North Rim's principal visitor areas are centered around Bright Angel Point. Because it is so much higher than the South Rim, it is closed from December 1 through May 15 each year, due to the enhanced snowfall at elevation. Visitor services are closed or limited in scope after October 15.

On the North Rim there is the historic Grand Canyon Lodge managed by Forever Resorts and a campground near the lodge, managed by the national park staff.

Climate

According to the Köppen climate classification system, Grand Canyon National Park has five climate zones; Cold Semi-Arid (BSk), Humid Continental Dry Cool Summer (Dsb), Humid Continental Dry Warm Summer (Dsa), Warm Summer Mediterranean (Csb), and Hot Summer Mediterranean (Csa). The plant hardiness zone at Grand Canyon Visitor Center is 7a with an average annual extreme minimum temperature of 3.3 °F (−15.9 °C).

Activities

North Rim

There are few roads on the North Rim, but there are some notable vehicle-accessible lookout points, including Point Imperial, Roosevelt Point, and Cape Royal. Mule rides are also available to a variety of places, including several thousand feet down into the canyon.

Many visitors to the North Rim choose to make use of the variety of hiking trails including the Widforss Trail, Uncle Jim's Trail, the Transept Trail, and the North Kaibab Trail. The North Kaibab Trail can be followed all the way down to the Colorado River, connecting across the river to the South Kaibab Trail and the Bright Angel Trail, which continue up to the South Rim of the Grand Canyon.

The Toroweap Overlook is located in the western part of the park on the North Rim. Access is via unpaved roads off Route 389 west of Fredonia, Arizona. The roads lead through Grand Canyon–Parashant National Monument and to the overlook.

South Rim

A variety of activities at the South Rim cater to park visitors. A driving tour along the South Rim is split into two segments. From March to December, access to Hermit's Rest is restricted to the free shuttle provided by the Park Service.

Hikes can begin almost anywhere along this trail, and a shuttle can return hikers to their point of origin. Mather Point, the first view most people reach when entering from the south entrance, is a popular place to begin.

Private canyon flyovers are provided by helicopters and small airplanes out of Las Vegas, Phoenix, and Grand Canyon National Park Airport. Due to a crash in the 1990s, scenic flights are no longer allowed to fly within  of the rim within the Grand Canyon National Park. Flights within the canyon are still available outside of park boundaries.

Grand Canyon Conservancy 
The Grand Canyon Conservancy is an organization dedication to the conservation of the Grand Canyon National Park. Currently, it has four main challenges to complete. 

 Creating Inter-tribal cultural sites
 Dark Sky Preservation
 Discovery and exploration of the Park
 Trail creation and preservation

Development
The U.S. government halted development of a 1.6 million acre area including the national park from 1966 to 2009, known as the Bennett Freeze, because of an ownership dispute between Hopi and Navajo.

Grand Canyon Association

The Grand Canyon Association (GCA) is the National Park Service's official nonprofit partner. It raises private funds to benefit Grand Canyon National Park by operating retail shops and visitor centers within the park, and providing educational opportunities about the natural and cultural history of the region.

See also

 (image gallery)
 List of trails in Grand Canyon National Park
 List of national parks of the United States

References

External links

Grand Canyon National Park Lodge

Historic American Engineering Record (HAER) documentation, filed under Grand Canyon Village, Coconino County, AZ:

A 6-minute low resolution video of a flight over the Grand Canyon (1993)

 
1919 establishments in Arizona
 
Historic American Engineering Record in Arizona
Historic American Landscapes Survey in Arizona
Parks in Coconino County, Arizona
Parks in Mohave County, Arizona
Protected areas established in 1919
Protected areas on the Colorado River
World Heritage Sites in the United States
Articles containing video clips
Geotopes